Melinda Airport  is an airstrip just east of Hope Creek, a village in the Stann Creek District of Belize. The gravel runway is on the south edge of the Melinda Forest Reserve, and just off the Hummingbird Highway.

See also

Transport in Belize
List of airports in Belize

References

External links 
OpenStreetMap - Melinda Airport
OurAirports - Melinda Airport

Airports in Belize
Stann Creek District